As Time Goes By is an album by pianist Duke Jordan recorded in 1985 and released on the Danish SteepleChase label.

Reception

AllMusic awarded the album 4 stars.

Track listing
 "In a Mellow Tone" (Duke Ellington, Milt Gabler) - 6:45
 "Lady Dingbat" (Duke Jordan) - 3:09 Bonus track on CD reissue
 "A Foggy Day" (George Gershwin, Ira Gershwin) - 6:36
 "Answer Me" (Gerhard Winkler, Carl Sigman) - 3:37
 "Layout Blues" (Jordan) - 4:43
 "Glad I Met Pat" (Jordan) - 3:38 Bonus track on CD reissue
 "W'utless" (Jordan) - 2:58 Bonus track on CD reissue
 "As Time Goes By" (Herman Hupfeld) - 5:02
 "Jordanish" (Jordan) - 2:43 Bonus track on CD reissue
 "Drawers" (Jordan) - 6:48
 "Lush Life/Smoke Gets in Your Eyes" (Billy Strayhorn/Jerome Kern, Otto Harbach) - 5:32
 "When You're Smiling" (Mark Fisher, Joe Goodwin, Larry Shay) - 3:57
 "Mellow Mood" (Jordan) - 3:07 Bonus track on CD reissue

Personnel
Duke Jordan - piano
Jesper Lundgaard - bass (tracks 1, 3-5, 8 & 10-12)
Billy Hart - drums (tracks 1, 3-5, 8 & 10-12)

References

1989 albums
Duke Jordan albums
SteepleChase Records albums